Podospora decipiens is a species of coprophilous fungus in the family Podosporaceae. It is especially common on the islands around Greece, where it grows on the dung of sheep, goats and donkeys.

References

External links

Fungi described in 1883
Fungi of Greece
Sordariales